Phyllocladan-16α-ol synthase (EC 4.2.3.45, PaDC1) is an enzyme with systematic name (+)-copalyl-diphosphate diphosphate-lyase (phyllocladan-16α-ol-forming). This enzyme catalyses the following chemical reaction

 (+)-copalyl diphosphate + H2O  phyllocladan-16α-ol + diphosphate

The adjacent gene PaDC2 codes , copalyl diphosphate synthase.

References

External links 
 

EC 4.2.3